Straßlach-Dingharting is a municipality  in the district of Munich in Bavaria in Germany.

References

Munich (district)